Bruern or Bruern Abbey is a hamlet and civil parish on the River Evenlode about  north of Burford in West Oxfordshire. The 2001 Census recorded the parish population as 62.

Cistercian Abbey
In 1147 Nicholas Basset founded a Cistercian Abbey here as a daughter house of Waverley Abbey in Surrey. The Abbey held property in west Oxfordshire, east Gloucestershire and at Priddy in Somerset. In 1382 the abbey also bought the manor of Fifield, Oxfordshire. The abbey was dissolved in October 1536.  After the dissolution, the Abbey became the property of Sir Anthony Cope of Hanwell, Oxfordshire, ancestor of the Cope baronets. 

In 1720 a baroque country house was built for the Cope family, possibly on the site of the former abbey. A Georgian cottage in the grounds of the house includes a three-bay vaulted chamber which may be a remnant of the original abbey buildings.  Michael Bishop, Baron Glendonbrook, purchased the 18th-century property in 2012. The Abbey has been completely refurbished under his ownership, including the installation of "a large and impressive cantilever stone staircase and twenty-five kilometres of data cabling' as well as a 'large underground car park".

References

Sources

1147 establishments in England
Religious organizations established in the 1140s
1536 disestablishments in England
Monasteries in Oxfordshire
Cistercian monasteries in England
Hamlets in Oxfordshire
Civil parishes in Oxfordshire
West Oxfordshire District
Christian monasteries established in the 12th century
Monasteries dissolved under the English Reformation